Czechoslovakia competed at the 1988 Summer Olympics in Seoul, South Korea, after having boycotted the previous Games in 1984. 163 competitors, 110 men and 53 women, took part in 97 events in 17 sports.

Medalists

Competitors
The following is the list of number of competitors in the Games.

Athletics

Men's 10.000 metres
 Martin Vrabel
 Heat — did not finish (→ did not advance)

Men's Marathon 
 Karel David 
 Final — 2"26.12 (→ 55th place)

Men's Discus Throw
 Géjza Valent
 Qualifying Heat – 63.46m
 Final – 65.80m (→ 6th place)
 Imrich Bugár
 Qualifying Heat – 61.94m
 Final – 60.88m (→ 12th place)

Men's Javelin Throw 
 Jan Železný 
 Qualification — 85.90m
 Final — 84.12m (→  Silver Medal)
 Zdenek Nenadal
 Qualification — 75.56m (→ did not advance)

Men's Shot Put
 Remigius Machura
 Qualifying Heat – 20.16m
 Final – 20.57m (→ 5th place)

Men's Decathlon 
 Roman Hraban — 7781 points (→ 20th place) 
 100 metres — 10.98s
 Long Jump — 7.07m
 Shot Put — 15.84m
 High Jump — 1.79m
 400 metres — 49.68s
 110m Hurdles — 14.94s
 Discus Throw — 45.32m
 Pole Vault — 4.90m
 Javelin Throw — 60.48m
 1.500 metres — 5:06.68s

 Veroslav Valenta — 7442 points (→ 28th place) 
 100 metres — 11.51s
 Long Jump — 7.01m
 Shot Put — 14.17m
 High Jump — 1.94m
 400 metres — 51.216s
 110m Hurdles — 15.18s
 Discus Throw — 45.84m
 Pole Vault — 4.60m
 Javelin Throw — 56.28m
 1.500 metres — 5:03.17s

Men's 20 km Walk
 Jozef Pribilinec
 Final — 1:19:57 (→  Gold Medal)
 Roman Mrázek
 Final — 1:20:43 (→ 5th place)

Men's 50 km Walk
 Pavol Szikora
 Final — 3:47:04 (→ 10th place)
 Pavol Blazek
 Final — 3:47:31 (→ 12th place)
 Roman Mrazek
 Final — 3:50:46 (→ 17th place)

Women's Marathon 
 Ludmila Melicherová 
 Final — 2"43.56 (→ 45th place)

Women's Discus Throw
 Zdeňka Šilhavá
 Qualifying Heat – 66.52m
 Final – 67.84m (→ 6th place)

Women's Shot Put
 Zdeňka Šilhavá
 Qualification – 19.74m
 Final – 18.86m (→ 11th place)
 Sona Vasickova
 Qualification — did not start (→ did not advance)

Women's Heptathlon 
 Zuzana Lajbnerová
 Final Result — 6252 points (→ 9th place)

Basketball

Women's tournament

Team roster

Group play

Classification 5–8

Classification 7/8

Boxing

Canoeing

Cycling

Thirteen cyclists, all men, represented Czechoslovakia in 1988.

Men's road race
 Jozef Regec
 Luděk Štyks
 Luboš Lom

Men's team time trial
 Vladimír Hrůza
 Vladimír Kinšt
 Milan Křen
 Jozef Regec

Men's sprint
 Vratislav Šustr

Men's individual pursuit
 Roman Čermák

Men's team pursuit
 Svatopluk Buchta
 Zbyněk Fiala
 Pavel Soukup
 Aleš Trčka
 Pavel Tesař

Men's points race
 Luboš Lom

Gymnastics

Handball

Judo

Modern pentathlon

Three male pentathletes represented Czechoslovakia in 1988.

Men's Individual Competition:
 Milan Kadlec — 5130pts (→ 11th place)
 Tomáš Fleissner — 5010pts (→ 19th place)
 Jiří Prokopius — 4903pts (→ 29th place)

Men's Team Competition:
 Kadlec, Fleissner, and Prokopius — 15043pts (→ 6th place)

Rhythmic gymnastics

Rowing

Shooting

Swimming

Men's 50m Freestyle
 Petr Kladiva
 Heat – 23.53 (→ did not advance, 23rd place)

Men's 100m Freestyle
 Petr Kladiva
 Heat – 51.39 (→ did not advance, 26th place)

Men's 100m Backstroke
 Pavel Vokoun
 Heat – 58.88 (→ did not advance, 30th place)

Men's 200m Backstroke
 Pavel Vokoun
 Heat – 2:07.24 (→ did not advance, 28th place)

Men's 100m Breaststroke
 Radek Beinhauer
 Heat – 1:04.61 (→ did not advance, 25th place)
 Alexander Marcek
 Heat – 1:04.95 (→ did not advance, 28th place)

Men's 200m Breaststroke
 Radek Beinhauer
 Heat – 2:18.02
 B-Final – 2:18.13 (→ 12th place)
 Alexander Marcek
 Heat – 2:18.44
 B-Final – 2:18.51 (→ 15th place)

Men's 100m Butterfly
 Robert Wolf
 Heat – 55.73 (→ did not advance, 21st place)

Men's 200m Butterfly
 Ondrej Bures
 Heat – 2:02.93 (→ did not advance, 22nd place)

Men's 400m Individual Medley
 Ondrej Bures
 Heat – 4:29.62 (→ did not advance, 19th place)

Men's 4 × 100 m Medley Relay
 Pavel Vokoun, Radek Beinhauer, Robert Wolf, and Petr Kladiva
 Heat – 3:49.90 (→ did not advance, 13th place)

Table tennis

Tennis

Women's Singles Competition
 Regina Rajchrtová
 First Round – Lost to Leila Meskhi (Soviet Union) 5-7 5-7
 Jana Novotná
 First Round – Defeated Isabelle Demongeot (France) 6-4 6-3
 Second Round – Lost to Barbara Paulus (Austria) 4-6 3-6
 Helena Suková
 First Round – Bye
 Second Round – Lost to Il-Soon Kim (South Korea) 2-6 6-4 2-6

Men's Doubles Competition
 Miloslav Mečíř and Milan Šrejber →  Bronze Medal
 First Round – Defeated Liu Shuhua and Ma Keqin (China) 7-5 6-1 6-4
 Second Round – Defeated Vijay Amritraj and Anand Amritraj (India) 4-6 6-4 4-6 6-4 6-2 
 Quarterfinals – Defeated Guy Forget and Henri Leconte (France) 3-6 4-6 7-5 6-3 9-7
 Semifinals – Lost to Ken Flach and Robert Seguso (United States) 2-6 4-6 1-6

Weightlifting

Wrestling

References

Nations at the 1988 Summer Olympics
1988
Summer Olympics